"From This Moment On" is a 1950 popular song written by Cole Porter, which has since become a jazz standard. It was originally written for the 1950 musical Out of This World, but director George Abbott dropped it from the musical before its Broadway premiere, possibly due to lackluster singing by cast member William Eythe. It was then included in MGM's 1953 film Kiss Me Kate, an adaptation of Porter's stage musical Kiss Me, Kate when it was sung by Ann Miller, Tommy Rall, Bob Fosse and Bobby Van. In theatrical versions of Kiss Me, Kate it goes now as a duet of Harrison Howell and Lilli Vanessi (since the 1999 revival).

Many versions of the song have been recorded, including those by: 

Doris Day - a single release in 1950.
Les Brown - Live At The Hollywood Palladium (1953)
Anita O'Day - for her album An Evening with Anita O'Day (1955)
Ella Fitzgerald - for Ella Fitzgerald Sings the Cole Porter Song Book (1956)
Frank Sinatra - A Swingin' Affair! (1957)
Lena Horne - Stormy Weather (1957)
Rosemary Clooney - from the album On Stage (1955)
The Supremes sang this song for their album The Supremes at the Copa (1965), however, it was removed from the official album. You can find this version on youtube.
The Carpenters on their 1976 live album Live at the Palladium
Jimmy Somerville - from the album Red Hot + Blue (1990)
Jazz Orchestra of the Delta with Sandra Dudley - from the album Big Band Reflections of Cole Porter (2003) 
Diana Krall - included in the album From This Moment On (2006)

References

External links

1950s jazz standards
Songs written by Cole Porter
Ella Fitzgerald songs
1951 songs
Lena Horne songs
Rosemary Clooney songs
Bonnie Guitar songs
Pop standards